Amadou Gakou (born 25 March 1940) is a retired Senegalese sprinter. He competed in the 400 m event at the 1964, 1968 and 1972 Olympics with the best achievement of fourth place in 1968, setting a national record at 45.01 seconds. He won a silver medal at the 1965 All-Africa Games.

His sister is the grandmother of 400 metres runner Fatou Bintou Fall.

References

External links
 

1940 births
Living people
Sportspeople from Dakar
Senegalese male sprinters
Athletes (track and field) at the 1964 Summer Olympics
Athletes (track and field) at the 1968 Summer Olympics
Athletes (track and field) at the 1972 Summer Olympics
Olympic athletes of Senegal
African Games bronze medalists for Senegal
African Games medalists in athletics (track and field)
Athletes (track and field) at the 1965 All-Africa Games